Hunters Hill Parish is one of the 57 parishes of Cumberland County, New South Wales, a cadastral unit for use on land titles. It includes the eponymous suburb of Hunters Hill and the Municipality of Hunter's Hill in the east, while the western part of the parish largely corresponds with the City of Ryde.

References

Parishes of Cumberland County